Te Arataura is the executive board of the Kauhanganui, the legislative council of the Waikato Tainui. It has 10 representatives elected from Te Kauhanganui and an 11th member appointed by the Māori king. The Waikato-Tainui tribal administration (or iwi authority) is the "Waikato Raupatu Trustee Company Ltd", which replaced the "Tainui Māori Trust Board", and is situated at Hopuhopu, Ngāruawāhia.

References 

Māori politics
Ngāruawāhia